In Greek mythology, Antianeira (Ancient Greek: Ἀντιανείρης 'a match for men') may have been mother of the Argonaut Idmon by the god Apollo. The scholiast on Apollonius Rhodius, however, calls Asteria the mother of Idmon.

Notes

References 

 Apollonius Rhodius, Argonautica translated by Robert Cooper Seaton (1853-1915), R. C. Loeb Classical Library Volume 001. London, William Heinemann Ltd, 1912. Online version at the Topos Text Project.
 Apollonius Rhodius, Argonautica. George W. Mooney. London. Longmans, Green. 1912. Greek text available at the Perseus Digital Library.
 The Orphic Argonautica, translated by Jason Colavito. © Copyright 2011. Online version at the Topos Text Project.

Women in Greek mythology
Argive characters in Greek mythology